William FitzRoy, 3rd Duke of Cleveland, 2nd Duke of Southampton (19 February 1698 – 18 May 1774) was an English nobleman, styled Earl of Chichester from birth until 1730.

In 1730, he succeeded his father Charles as Duke of Southampton, Duke of Cleveland and Chief Butler of England. In 1731, he married Lady Henrietta Finch, the daughter of Daniel Finch, 2nd Earl of Nottingham. She died in 1742, without having left him children. He thereafter lived a retired life, enjoying his sinecures of Receiver-General of the Profits of the Seals in the King's Bench and Common Pleas, and Comptroller of the Seal and Green Wax Offices. The dukedoms and subsidiary titles became extinct upon his death.  The Cleveland dukedom was subsequently recreated for his grand-nephew William Vane, 1st Duke of Cleveland.

References

1698 births
1774 deaths
Dukes of Cleveland
Dukes of Southampton
Earls of Chichester